Kepler-43,formerly known as KOI-135,  is a star in the northern constellation of Cygnus. It is located at the celestial coordinates: Right Ascension , Declination . With an apparent visual magnitude of 13.996, this star is too faint to be seen with the naked eye. The Kepler-43 has a very strong starspot activity.

Planetary system
The Kepler spacecraft detected a transiting planet candidate around this star that was confirmed by radial velocity measurements taken by the SOPHIE spectrograph mounted on the 1.93 m telescope at the Haute-Provence Observatory.

The planet nightside temperature was measured to be 2043 K.

References

Cygnus (constellation)
G-type main-sequence stars
135
Planetary transit variables
Planetary systems with one confirmed planet